Mictla may refer to:

Mictlan, an Aztec underworld
Mictlantecuhtli, the king of Mictlan
Mictecacihuatl, the queen of Mictlan